Sandcastle is a 2010 feature film by Singaporean director Boo Junfeng.  It was the first Singaporean film to be screened at the International Critics' Week at the Cannes Film Festival. It won Best Feature Film and Best Director at the 1st Hanoi International Film Festival.

Plot
Just prior to 18-year-old En's mandatory enlistment into the Singaporean army, a series of events and disclosures threatens to alter his world view forever. The taste of his first romance, the death of his grandfather, his grandmother's worsening Alzheimer's disease, his schoolteacher mother's affair with an uptight military commander, and En's newfound awareness of his late father's student activist past all contribute to his decision to reevaluate the pieces of his life before they are erased by the tides of time.

Cast
Bobbi Chen as Ying	
Elena Chia as Mother
Bee Thiam Tan as Army Officer		
Joshua Tan as En	
Pin Pin Tan as Doctor

References

External links
 
 
 Official film trailer on YouTube

Singaporean drama films
2010s coming-of-age films
Films directed by Boo Junfeng